Dannstadt-Schauernheim is a Verbandsgemeinde ("collective municipality") in the district Rhein-Pfalz-Kreis, in Rhineland-Palatinate, Germany.

The seat of the Verbandsgemeinde is in Dannstadt-Schauernheim.

The Verbandsgemeinde Dannstadt-Schauernheim consists of the following Ortsgemeinden ("local municipalities"):

*seat of the Verbandsgemeinde

External links 

  

Verbandsgemeinde in Rhineland-Palatinate